KCZZ (1480 AM) is a Regional Mexican radio station licensed to Mission, Kansas and serving the Kansas City market. The station is owned by Edward Reyes, through licensee Reyes Media Group, Inc.

History
Prior to its current format, the station was, during the mid-1990s (as KCAZ), the home of Radio AAHS, a format that featured children's programming and music. After Radio AAHS discontinued operations in January 1998, Children's Broadcasting Corporation, the station's owner, needed programming for the ten CBC-owned and operated Radio AAHS stations until it could find buyers. In February 1998, KCAZ, along with the other nine CBC stations, became an outlet for "Beat Radio", which broadcast electronic dance music 12 hours a day until late October 1998.  On September 8, 2019, when ESPN Deportes discontinued operations, the station flipped to a Regional Mexican format.  As of January 2020, KCZZ has been the third station to play a Regional Mexican format along with KYYS and KDTD after KCTO flipped to an affiliate of Radio Maria.

References

External links

FCC history card

CZZ
Johnson County, Kansas
Regional Mexican radio stations in the United States
Radio stations established in 1957
1957 establishments in Kansas
CZZ